Rachelle Smith may refer to:

Rachelle Smith (footballer), Jamaican international female footballer
Rachelle Boone-Smith, American former sprint athlete